Yoana Georgieva Papazova (born 13 August 1992) is a Bulgarian footballer who plays as a midfielder for Women's Championship club FC NSA Sofia and the Bulgaria women's national team.

International career
Papazova capped for Bulgaria at senior level in a 3–0 friendly win against Luxembourg on 20 September 2020.

References

1992 births
Living people
Footballers from Sofia
Bulgarian women's footballers
Women's association football midfielders
FC NSA Sofia players
Bulgaria women's international footballers